Igor Vladimirovich Kuzmenko (born 3 November 1970) is a former Russian professional football player.

Club career
He played 3 seasons in the Russian Football National League for FC Kolos Krasnodar and FC Druzhba Maykop.

Honours
 Russian Second Division Zone 1 top scorer: 1992 (35 goals).

External links
 

1970 births
Living people
Soviet footballers
Russian footballers
Association football forwards
FC Kuban Krasnodar players